In computing, a directory is a file system cataloging structure which contains references to other computer files, and possibly other directories. On many computers, directories are known as folders, or drawers, analogous to a workbench or the traditional office filing cabinet. The name derives from books like a telephone directory that lists the phone numbers of all the people living in a certain area. 

Files are organized by storing related files in the same directory. In a hierarchical file system (that is, one in which files and directories are organized in a manner that resembles a tree), a directory contained inside another directory is called a subdirectory.  The terms parent and child are often used to describe the relationship between a subdirectory and the directory in which it is cataloged, the latter being the parent. The top-most directory in such a filesystem, which does not have a parent of its own, is called the root directory.

The freedesktop.org media type for directories within many Unix systems – including but not limited to systems using GNOME, KDE Plasma 5, or ROX Desktop as the desktop environment – is "inode/directory". This is not an IANA registered media type.

Overview
 
Historically, and even on some modern embedded systems, the file systems either had no support for directories at all or had only a "flat" directory structure, meaning subdirectories were not supported; there were only a group of top-level directories, each containing files. In modern systems, a directory can contain a mix of files and subdirectories.

A reference to a location in a directory system is called a path.

In many operating systems, programs have an associated working directory in which they execute. Typically, file names accessed by the program are assumed to reside within this directory if the file names are not specified with an explicit directory name.

Some operating systems restrict a user's access only to their home directory or project directory, thus isolating their activities from all other users.

In keeping with Unix philosophy, Unix systems treat directories as a type of file. Caveats include not being able to write to a directory file except indirectly by creating, renaming and removing file system objects in the directory and only being able to read from a directory file using directory-specific library routines and system calls that return records, not a byte-stream.

Folder metaphor

The name folder, presenting an analogy to the file folder used in offices, and used in a hierarchical file system design for the Electronic Recording Machine, Accounting (ERMA) Mark 1 published in 1958 as well as by Xerox Star, is used in almost all modern operating systems' desktop environments. Folders are often depicted with icons which visually resemble physical file folders.

There is a difference between a directory, which is a file system concept, and the graphical user interface metaphor that is used to represent it (a folder).  For example, Microsoft Windows uses the concept of special folders to help present the contents of the computer to the user in a fairly consistent way that frees the user from having to deal with absolute directory paths, which can vary between versions of Windows, and between individual installations. Many operating systems also have the concept of "smart folders" or virtual folders that reflect the results of a file system search or other operation. These folders do not represent a directory in the file hierarchy. Many email clients allow the creation of folders to organize email. These folders have no corresponding representation in the filesystem structure.

If one is referring to a container of documents, the term folder is more appropriate.  The term directory refers to the way a structured list of document files and folders are stored on the computer. The distinction can be due to the way a directory is accessed; on Unix systems,  is usually referred to as a directory when viewed in a command line console, but if accessed through a graphical file manager, users may sometimes call it a folder.

Lookup cache

Operating systems that support hierarchical filesystems (practically all modern ones) implement a form of caching to RAM of recent path lookups. In the Unix world, this is usually called Directory Name Lookup Cache (DNLC), although it is called dcache on Linux.

For local filesystems, DNLC entries normally expire only under pressure from other more recent entries. For network file systems a coherence mechanism is necessary to ensure that entries have not been invalidated by other clients.

See also
 File folder

Concepts
 Directory structure
 Filename
 Filesystem Hierarchy Standard
 Home directory
 Root directory
 Virtual folder
 Working directory

Commands
 cd (command)
 chroot
 dir (command)
 mkdir
 pushd and popd
 pwd
 tree (command)

References

External links

 Definition of directory by The Linux Information Project (LINFO)

Computer file systems
 
File system management